Wilhelm Hertzberg (* 6 June 1813 in Halberstadt; † 7 June 1879 in Bremen) was a prolific German philologist and translator.

Biography
Hertzberg received his education at the Universities of Halle and Bonn. In 1858 he became director of a business school (Handelsschule) and in 1866, a  principal of a high school (Gymnasium) in Bremen.

Achievements
Hertzberg is principally known for preparing a widely known four volume edition of the Roman poet Sextus Aurelius Propertius ("De S. Aurelii Propertii Amicitiis et Amoribus"; Halle, 1843–1845). He also published translations of Propertius' poetry (Stuttgart, 1838); Babrius' fables (Halle, 1846); Vergil's poetry (Stuttgart, 1859); Plautus's comedies (Stuttgart, 1861); Tennyson's poetry (Dessau, 1853); and Chaucer's Canterbury Tales (Hildburghausen, 1866). His final work was an edition and translation of the Late medieval "Libell of englishe policye" (Leipzig, 1878).

Literature
 D. Rohde: "Wilhelm Adolf Boguslav Hertzberg," in: Anglia 5 (1882), pp. 283–88. (eulogy)
 Richard Utz: Chaucer and the Discourse of German Philology (Brepols, Turnhout 2002), pp. 50–57. (on translation of Canterbury Tales)

References

1813 births
1879 deaths
German philologists
Chaucer scholars
German–English translators
Latin–English translators
19th-century German translators
German male poets
Translators of Virgil